Santa Rosa de Lima was an early 18th-century Spanish settlement in the Rio Chama valley, near the present-day town of Abiquiu in Rio Arriba County, New Mexico, United States

Description
By the 1730s, Spanish settlers were moving into the Chama River valley, and by 1744 at least 20 families were living in the present-day Abiquiú area, where they founded the Plaza de Santa Rosa de Lima. The church, on the plaza, was built circa 1744, and was in use until the 1930s. Repeated raids by Utes and Comanches caused the settlement to be abandoned in 1747. In 1750, the Spanish founded a new settlement at the present site of  Abiquiú, about a mile from Santa Rosa de Lima.

Today, the site of Santa Rosa de Lima is a ghost town, with substantial adobe ruins of the church, and mounds where the settlers' adobe houses stood. The site is private property, belonging to the Archdiocese of Santa Fe.

Santa Rosa de Lima de Abiquiu was added to the National Register of Historic Places in 1978, as listing #78001820.

See also

 Province of Santa Fe de Nuevo México, New Spain
 National Register of Historic Places listings in Rio Arriba County, New Mexico

References

 Pueblo de Abiquiú – A Genízaro Community by New Mexico Office of the State Historian

External links

 Plaza of Santa Rosa de Lima (ruins), photo

Buildings and structures in Rio Arriba County, New Mexico
Former Roman Catholic church buildings in New Mexico
Ghost towns in New Mexico
Colonial Mexico
Colonial New Mexico
Roman Catholic Archdiocese of Santa Fe
Churches on the National Register of Historic Places in New Mexico
1730s establishments in Mexico
History of Rio Arriba County, New Mexico
1734 establishments in the Spanish Empire
National Register of Historic Places in Rio Arriba County, New Mexico
Populated places on the National Register of Historic Places in New Mexico
Adobe churches in New Mexico